The Simpsons is an American animated sitcom that includes six main voice actors and numerous regular cast and recurring guest stars. The principal cast consists of Dan Castellaneta, Julie Kavner, Nancy Cartwright, Yeardley Smith, Hank Azaria and Harry Shearer. Pamela Hayden, Tress MacNeille, Maggie Roswell, Chris Edgerly, Eric Lopez, Alex Désert, Kevin Michael Richardson, Jenny Yokobori, Kimberly D. Brooks, Dawnn Lewis, Tony Rodriguez, Melanie Minichino, Jonathan Lipow, and Grey DeLisle have appeared as supporting cast members, along with former supporting cast members Russi Taylor, Karl Wiedergott, Marcia Mitzman Gaven, Doris Grau, Susan Blu, Jo Ann Harris, and Christopher Collins. Repeat guest cast members include Marcia Wallace, Phil Hartman, Jon Lovitz, Joe Mantegna and Kelsey Grammer. With the exception of "Old Money", episode credits list only the voice actors, and not the characters they voice.

Both Fox and the production crew wanted to keep their identities secret during the early seasons and closed most of the recording sessions while refusing to publish photos of the recording artists. The network eventually revealed which roles each actor performed in the episode "Old Money", because the producers said the voice actors should receive credit for their work. Every main cast member has won an Emmy for Outstanding Voice-Over Performance. Shearer was the last cast member to win, receiving his award in 2014 for the episode "Four Regrettings and a Funeral." Castellaneta and Azaria have won four, while Kavner, Cartwright, Smith, Shearer, Wallace, Grammer, and guest star Jackie Mason have each won one.

Regular cast

Background

Castellaneta and Kavner were asked to voice the lead roles of Homer and Marge Simpson as they were regular cast members of The Tracey Ullman Show on which The Simpsons shorts appeared. Cartwright auditioned for the part of Lisa, but found that Lisa was simply described as the "middle child" and at the time did not have much personality. She then became more interested in the role of Bart, so Simpsons creator Matt Groening let her try out for that part instead, and upon hearing her read, he gave her the job on the spot. Smith had initially been asked by casting director Bonita Pietila to audition for the role of Bart, but Pietila then realised that Smith's voice was too high, Smith was given the role of Lisa instead. When the show was commissioned for a full half-hour series, Shearer joined the cast and performed multiple roles. Groening and Sam Simon asked Shearer to join the cast as they were fans of his radio show. Azaria was only a guest actor in the first season, but became permanent in season 2. He first appeared in "Some Enchanted Evening", rerecording Christopher Collins's lines as Moe Szyslak. In 2001, Groening remarked that he still considered Azaria the "new guy."

Up until 1998, the six main actors were paid $30,000 per episode. In 1998 they were then involved in a pay dispute in which Fox threatened to replace them with new actors and went as far as preparing for casting of new voices. However, the issue was soon resolved and from 1998 to 2004, they were paid $125,000 per episode. In 2004, the voice actors intentionally skipped several table reads, demanding they be paid $360,000 per episode. The strike was resolved a month later and until 2008 they earned something between $250,000 and $360,000 per episode. In 2008, production for the twentieth season was put on hold due to new contract negotiations with the voice actors, who wanted a "healthy bump" in salary to an amount close to $500,000 per episode. The dispute was soon resolved, and the actors' salary was raised to $400,000 per episode.

In 2011, Fox announced that, due to financial difficulties, they were unable to continue to produce The Simpsons under its current contract and that unless there were pay cuts, the show could end. For the negotiations, the studio requested that the cast members accept a 45% cut of their salaries so that more seasons could be produced after season 23, or else that season would be the last. In the end, the studio and the actors reached a deal, in which the actors would take a pay cut of 30%, down to just over $300,000 per episode, prolonging the show to its 30th season. As well as the actors, everybody involved in the show took a pay cut.

Main cast

Other regular cast

Recurring guest voices

Awards and nominations

Notes

 A. Guest star Jackie Mason has voiced Rabbi Krustofski in six episodes.
 B. Replaced Frank Welker.
 C. Doris was initially retired after Doris Grau's death, but has returned in several episodes since "The Mook, the Chef, the Wife and Her Homer", and has been voiced by MacNeille.
 D. Guest star Pamela Reed voiced Ruth on three occasions.
 E. Between 1999 and 2002, Marcia Mitzman Gaven voiced the three characters because Roswell resigned after Fox refused to raise her travel expenses. Roswell returned in 2002.

References

General
 

 
 

Specific

External links
Cast list at the IMDb

Simpsons, The
The Simpsons lists
Salary controversies in television